Saikia was a Paik officer of the Ahom militia who led a hundred paiks. There was a similar office in the Koch kingdom as well. As it was a purely administrative position, the title holder could belong to diverse ethnic groups. Today, this title is used as a surname by people of various ethnic origins. It is found among Kaibarta community. The Saikia in the Paik system was higher in rank to the Bora (in charge of 20 paiks) but lower in rank to the Hazarika (in charge of a thousand paiks).

Etymology

The word Saikia, is a derivative of the Assamese word - Xô, meaning 'one hundred - 100'. It was a military title given to people of various ethnic origins.

Historical Usage

The Ahom Kingdom of medieval Assam used the Paik system, a form of corvee labour  In this system, a Paik (one soldier) was the tiniest unit of the Ahom military system. A Saikia was the commanding officer of 100 such paiks. The appointment of a Saikia was the responsibility of his Phukan or Rajkhowa (governor of a territory). 
The paiks had the right to reject a Saikia and request another officer of their choice. Appointments were made irrespective of the paik's religion or ethnicity.

Among other ethnic groups, there is mention of Chutia Saikias in several instances of Buranjis. For instance, during the revolt of 1775, ten Chutia Saikias were involved along with a Nara chief of Khamjang. After the fall of the Chutia kingdom, Saikias were also appointed among Chutia blacksmiths and other guilds to look after the works. Apart from these, during the Moamoria rebellion, the rebels also appointed Saikias among themselves.

Current Usage

Over the years, the usage of this title has ceased to be a professional or military title. The surname is now common to Hindus in Assam. Among the Hindus, the surname is mostly written by 
Sutiya, Kalita, Koch, Sonowal Kacharis and Thengal Kacharis.

Notable people

Ankush Saikia - Novelist, editor, and former journalist
Anupam Saikia - Mathematician
Baneswar Saikia - Politician of Revolutionary Communist Party of India
Bhabendra Nath Saikia - Physicist, Novelist, Film director.
Hiteswar Saikia - Politician, Chief Minister of Assam from 1983 to 1985 and 1991–1996.
Mrinal Saikia, Indian politician
Nagen Saikia - Writer

References

Works cited
 

Indian surnames
Assamese-language surnames
Ahom kingdom